is one of the private junior Colleges located at Kōfu, Yamanashi in Japan. It was established in 1951, and is now attached to Yamanashi Gakuin University. It consists of two departments.

Department and Graduate Course

Departments 
 Department of food and nutrition
 Department of early childhood education

See also 
 Yamanashi Gakuin University

External links
 YGJC Official Website

Private universities and colleges in Japan
Japanese junior colleges
Universities and colleges in Yamanashi Prefecture
Kōfu, Yamanashi